Acacia latior is a shrub belonging to the genus Acacia and the subgenus Juliflorae that is endemic to western Australia.

Description
It tends to have a dense and compact crown with sparingly fluted stems. The smooth or finely fissured bark is a brown-grey colour. It has densely silver to white hairy new shoots. The glabrous branchlets are obscurely ribbed and angular or flattened at extremities. The flat, grey-green to green coloured phyllodes have a narrowly oblanceolate to linear-elliptic shape and are straight to shallowly incurved.

Distribution
It is native to an area in the Mid West region of Western Australia. It is commonly found around Mullewa with scattered populations around Gnows Nest and the Blue Hill ranges and around Karara and Warriedar stations. The shrub is often situated on sandplains and gravelly rises growing in sandy, rocky clay or loamy soils as a part of shrubland or scrub communities and is often associated with mallee style Eucalytps and other species of Acacia''.

See also
List of Acacia species

References

latior
Acacias of Western Australia
Plants described in 2008
Taxa named by Bruce Maslin